Giannis Koutantos (born 31 January 2000) is a Greek professional footballer who plays as an attacking midfielder for Super League 2 club Irodotos.

References

2000 births
Living people
Super League Greece 2 players
Football League (Greece) players
Ergotelis F.C. players
Association football midfielders
Footballers from Heraklion
Greek footballers